Grevillea rosieri is a species of flowering plant in the family Proteaceae and is endemic to the south-west of Western Australia. It is a low spreading to erect shrub with linear leaves, the edges rolled under, and small groups of red to rusty red flowers, the style sometimes cream-coloured.

Description

Taxonomy
Grevillea rosieri was first formally described in 1986 by Donald McGillivray in his book  "New Names in Grevillea (Proteaceae)" from specimens collected in 1951. The specific epithet (rosier) honours S.B. Rosier, an Anglican minister who discovered the species.

Distribution and habitat
This grevillea grows in shrubland from near Wubin to near Kirwan Nature Reserve (near Burakin) in the Avon Wheatbelt, Swan Coastal Plain and Yalgoo bioregions of south-western Western Australia.

Conservation status
Grevillea rosieri is listed as  "Priority Two" by the Western Australian Government Department of Biodiversity, Conservation and Attractions, meaning that it is poorly known and from only one or a few locations.

See also
 List of Grevillea species

References

rosieri
Proteales of Australia
Eudicots of Western Australia
Taxa named by Donald McGillivray
Plants described in 1986